Of Events is a Canadian animated short film, directed by Mathieu Tremblay and released in 2011. Animated in black and white, the film centres on a group of people travelling on a train.

The film premiered at the 2011 Toronto International Film Festival, where it received an honorable mention from the jury for the Best Canadian Short Film award. It subsequently received a Jutra Award nomination for Best Animated Short Film at the 14th Jutra Awards in 2012.

References

External links

2011 films
2011 short films
Canadian animated short films
2010s Canadian films